Charles William Royster (November 27, 1944 – February 6, 2020) was an American historian and a Boyd Professor at Louisiana State University.

Life
He was born in Nashville, Tennessee on November 27, 1944, the only son of Ferd Neuman Royster of Robards, Kentucky, a United Methodist minister, and Laura Jean (Smotherman) Royster of Carthage, Tennessee, an elementary school teacher (both now deceased).  He moved with his parents and younger sister from Atlanta, Georgia to California in 1954, where, with the exception of his military duty, he continued to maintain residence until accepting a post-doctoral fellowship at College of William and Mary in Williamsburg, Virginia, revising his dissertation for publication as his first book, A Revolutionary People at War.  He was salutatorian of his high school graduating class in Dixon, California, as well as manager of the basketball team, founder and president of the Chess Club, and recipient of several academic scholarships, which financed his tuition at University of California, Berkeley, from which he graduated with an A.B. in 1966, an M.A. in 1967, and a Ph.D in 1977. At Berkeley, he studied under Robert Middlekauff, a historian of the Revolutionary period. During his years of service to the United States Air Force, he was stationed in Thailand and Shreveport, Louisiana, being honorably discharged as a captain prior to beginning his doctoral program in history. He was also a member of Phi Beta Kappa national academic honor society and was an avid supporter of the Oregon Shakespeare Festival in Ashland, Oregon (to whom he dedicated one of his books) for the past four decades.

Dr. Royster's dissertation students have included Dr. Edward L. Bond, Dr. Robert Gudmestad, Dr. Andrew Lannen, Dr. James MacDonald, and Dr. Colin E. Woodward.

He lived in Baton Rouge, Louisiana.

Awards and honors
 1981 Francis Parkman Prize
 1982 Guggenheim Fellow
 1992 Bancroft Prize
 1992 Lincoln Prize
 1992 Charles Snydor Award
 Society of American Historians Fellow

Works

  (reprint 1996)

Editor

References

1944 births
2020 deaths
People from Nashville, Tennessee
People from Baton Rouge, Louisiana
University of California, Berkeley alumni
Louisiana State University faculty
21st-century American historians
21st-century American male writers
Lincoln Prize winners
Bancroft Prize winners
Historians from Louisiana
American male non-fiction writers